First Blood is an American hardcore band from San Francisco, California, formed in 2002.

Background
First Blood released their debut record, an eponymously titled EP, in 2003. Then, the following year, they released a split EP with Blacklisted titled The Dead Man's Hand. Finally, in 2006, the band released their debut full-length album, Killafornia, on Trustkill Records. First Blood also went on tour that year with Ignite, Comeback Kid, The Red Chord, Sick of It All, Stretch Arm Strong, and others, and appeared at the New England Metal Fest on April 29. The band then toured extensively in 2007 with the likes of Full Blown Chaos, Since the Flood and Death Before Dishonor.

In 2010 they released their second album, Silence Is Betrayal, on Bullet Tooth Records.

On February 10, 2017, First Blood released its third studio album Rules, the first in seven years, produced by Will Putney on Pure Noise Records. The lyric video of "Rules of Conviction" was premiered in January of that year, and the video of "Rules of Conviction" featuring Jesse Barnett of Stick to Your Guns and Kobayashi Hiroyuki of Loyal to the Grave in June.

Lineup

Carl Schwartz vocals (2002–present)
Robert Rozendaal bass (2019–present)
Johan Vesters – guitar (2014–2019, 2022-present)
Bobby Blood drums (2003-2016, 2022-present)

Former
Eddie Virgil drums (Alcatraz)
Anthony Pizzarelli bass (Alcatraz)
Manuel Peralez guitar
Kyle Dixon guitar
Doug Weber guitar
Brandon Thomas drums (recorded drums on "Killafornia".)
Michael Orrisdrums (first touring drummer in support of the release of "Killafornia" - toured on and off up to 2018.)
Ryan Brooks drums (filled in on tour when the band was seeking a full-time drummer)
Daniel Fletcher guitar
Joe Ellis bass
Marc Strömberg bass (filled-in on tour 2012)
Jakob Arevärn guitar (filled-in on tour 2013)
Sebastian Sahin bass (filled-in on tour 2013)
Rhett Hornberger drums
AJ Borish drums, bass (filled in on tour 2012, 2013)
John Torn bass (2013–2015)
AJ Worrell drums (filled in on drums and guitar in prior years) (2016–2017)
Lordninnaum – guitar (2012–2019)
Daiske Shibamori – bass (2017–2019)
Joel Heijda – drums (2017–2019)
Joe Kenney guitar (2019–2022)
Tiago drums (2019–2022)

Discography
 First Blood EP - 2003, Bridge 9 Records
 Dead Man's Hand 03 - 2005, Deathwish Inc. (Split record with Blacklisted)
 Killafornia – May 2, 2006, Trustkill Records
 Silence Is Betrayal – November 9, 2010, Bullet Tooth Records
 Rules - February 10, 2017, Pure Noise Records (peaked at No. 18 on the Billboard Top Heatseekers chart)

References

External links

First Blood label profile
Official website
Heavy Street interview

Musical groups established in 2003
Musical groups from San Francisco
Deathwish Inc. artists
Hardcore punk groups from California
Pure Noise Records artists
Trustkill Records artists